Q'atawini (Aymara q'atawi lime, -ni a suffix to indicate ownership, "the one with lime", Hispanicized spelling Catahuini) is a mountain in the Andes of Peru, about  high. It is located in the Puno Region, Lampa Province, on the border of the districts Cabanilla and Santa Lucía.

References

Mountains of Puno Region
Mountains of Peru